San Michele Arcangelo (Church of St Michael the Archangel) is a Roman catholic church located in Anacapri, Capri, Italy. Located on Piazza San Nicola and built in 1719, it is octagonal in shape and of Baroque style. The church received a "monument" designation due to its notable majolica floor mosaic.

References

Roman Catholic churches in Capri, Campania
Roman Catholic churches completed in 1719
Octagonal churches in Italy
1719 establishments in Italy
18th-century Roman Catholic church buildings in Italy